A monster truck is a specialized off-road vehicle with a heavy duty suspension, four-wheel steering, large-displacement V8 engines and oversized tires constructed for competition and entertainment uses. Originally created by modifying stock pickup trucks and sport utility vehicles (SUVs), they have evolved into purpose-built vehicles with tube-frame chassis and fiberglass bodies rather than metal.

Monster trucks developed in the late 1970s and came into the public eye in the early 1980s as side acts at popular motocross, tractor pulling, and mud bogging events, where they were used in car-crushing demonstrations. Today they are usually the main attraction with motocross, mud bogging, ATV racing, or demolition derbies as supporting events.

Events

Monster truck shows typically have two main events, a race and a freestyle stunt driving competition. Races are conducted as a single-elimination tournament on short, symmetrical tracks, which may include obstacles such as junk cars or dirt mounds. The length and complexity of the track can vary with the size of the venue, with courses in indoor arenas typically being shorter with fewer obstacles.

In freestyle events, each driver puts on a performance consisting of stunts such as obstacle jumps, backflips, wheelies, and doughnuts. A panel of judges assign points to each performance and the driver with the most points is declared the winner. Historically, additional vehicles for the drivers to crush, such as motor homes and school buses, were placed on the track specifically for the freestyle event, however incidents of debris flying into the stands and causing serious injuries have influenced most event promoters to turn away from such obstacles. Most freestyle courses now consist mostly of large mounds and ramps erected to allow the trucks to perform large jumps and wheelies upon landing. Freestyle performances have a set time limit and only one truck is allowed on the track at a time as a safety measure. Freestyle events are typically the final competition of a show, as damage to the trucks would make them unable to race.

History

In the late 1970s, heavily modified pickup trucks were becoming popular and the sports of mud bogging and truck pulling were gaining in popularity. Several truck owners had created lifted trucks to compete in such events, and soon competition to hold the title of "biggest truck" developed. The trucks which garnered the most national attention were Bob Chandler's Bigfoot, Everett Jasmer's USA-1, Fred Shafer and Jack Willman Sr.'s Bear Foot, and Jeff Dane's King Kong.

In April 1981, Bob Chandler drove over junked cars in Bigfoot in what is often believed to be the first monster truck to crush cars. Chandler drove Bigfoot over a pair of cars in a field as a test of the truck's ability, and filmed it to use as a promotional tool in his four-wheel drive performance shop. An event promoter saw the video of the car crush and asked Chandler to do it in front of a crowd. Initially hesitant because of the "destructive" image that could be associated with Bigfoot, Chandler eventually agreed. After some smaller shows, Chandler performed the feat in the Pontiac Silverdome in 1982. At this show, Chandler also debuted a new version of Bigfoot with 66-inch tires. At a prior event in the early 1980s, when Bigfoot was still running 48-inch tires, Bob George, one of the owners of a motorsport promotion company named Truck-a-rama – later known as the United States Hot Rod Association (USHRA) – is said to have coined the phrase "monster truck" when referring to Bigfoot. The term "monster truck" became the generic name for all trucks with oversized tires.

King Kong and Bear Foot each followed Bigfoot to  tires, and soon other monster trucks, such as King Krunch, Maddog, and Virginia Giant were being constructed. These early trucks were built on stock chassis which were heavily reinforced, used leaf spring suspension, a stock body, and heavy axles from military-specification vehicles to support the tires.

For most of the early 1980s, monster trucks performed primarily exhibitions as a side show to truck pulling or mud bogging events. In August 1983, Bigfoot and USA-1 competed in the first side-by-side monster truck race, which was filmed for the television show That's Incredible. By 1985 major promoters, such as the USHRA and TNT Motorsports, were racing monster trucks on a regular basis. In 1988, TNT Motorsports created a series to establish the first national championship of monster truck racing; USA-1 and rookie driver Rod Litzau edged out Bigfoot, driven by Rich Hoosier, for the title.

In 1988, to standardize rules for truck construction and safety, Bob Chandler, Braden, and George Carpenter formed the Monster Truck Racing Association (MTRA). The MTRA created standard safety rules to govern monster trucks. The organization still plays a major role in the sport's development in the US and EU.

With racing taking precedence, several teams began to think in new ways as to how the trucks could be built. Towards the end of 1988, Gary Cook and David Morris debuted Equalizer, a truck with a combination of coil springs and shock absorbers as the main source of suspension rather than the standard of leaf springs and shock absorbers. However, the biggest innovation came from Chandler, also in 1989, when the CAD-designed Bigfoot #8 debuted featuring a full tubular chassis and a long-travel suspension system made of triangulated four-link suspensions, bump stops, limit straps, cantilevers, and shock absorbers charged with nitrogen gas. The truck revolutionized how monster trucks were built, and within a few years most top-level teams built similar vehicles.

In 1991, TNT was purchased by the USHRA and their points series were merged. The Special Events championship began to grow in popularity with teams as it had open qualifying spots which the invite-only USHRA championship did not have. The Special Events series lost its Pendaliner sponsorship in 1997. The short-lived ProMT series started in 2000.

Even though racing was dominant as a competition, USHRA events began having freestyle exhibitions as early as 1993. These exhibitions were developed as drivers, notably Dennis Anderson of the extremely popular Grave Digger, began asking for time to come out and perform if they lost in early rounds of racing. Promoters began to notice the popularity of freestyle among fans, and in 2000 the USHRA began holding freestyle as a judged competition at events, and now awards a freestyle championship.

Promoters
The USHRA's Monster Jam series, now owned by Feld Entertainment, is currently the largest, touring through the United States, Canada and select regions of Europe. Other promoters of monster truck events include the Toughest Monster Truck Tour, the Monster X Tour, and Hot Wheels Monster Trucks Live.

Truck construction

The first monster trucks built were pickup trucks and SUVs that were modified with larger suspension and larger tires. Today, trucks now have custom built tubular chassis, with four-link suspension to provide up to four feet of clearance, and they also now have fiberglass bodies that attach to the chassis separately and are designed to be easily removed and easily replaced when damaged. The use of fiberglass panel bodies has allowed monster truck owners to develop a wide variety of thematic concept trucks that scarcely resemble the modified stock trucks that became early monster trucks.

Engines are now typically mounted behind the driver on most trucks and are typically supercharged, run on a methanol-based fuel, and have displacement of up to 575 cubic inches (9.42 L). Axles are mostly taken from either heavy-duty military trucks or road vehicles such as school buses, and are modified to have a planetary gear reduction at the hub to help turn the tires. All trucks have hydraulic steering in both the front and the rear (four wheel steering), with the front wheels controlled by the steering wheel and the rear wheels by a toggle switch.

The tires are typically "terra" tires used on farm equipment, and are of size 66-inch in diameter, 43-inch in width, and fit on 25-inch diameter rims (168×109–63 cm).

Most trucks utilize a modified or custom-designed automatic transmission, such as a Turbo 400, Powerglide, Ford C6 transmission, or a TorqueFlite 727. A limited number of trucks utilize a Lenco transmission, which traces its roots to drag racing. Most of the automatic transmissions are heavily modified with transbrakes, manual valve bodies, and heavy duty gear sets. Trucks running a Lenco use a centrifugal clutch as opposed to a torque converter, which are used in automatic transmissions. Lenco transmissions are usually found in two-speed or three speed configurations, and are commonly shifted using compressed carbon dioxide.

The trucks have many safety features, several of which are required just to run in the indoor arenas that the trucks frequent. Trucks are equipped with three shut-off switches: a remote ignition interrupt (RII), which allows event stewards to stop a truck remotely, a switch within the driver's reach in the cab, and another at the rear of the truck so that all electrical power may be shut off in the event of a rollover.

Many trucks are constructed with the driver sitting in the center of the cab for visibility. Most cabs are shielded with Lexan or comparable polycarbonate, which not only protects the driver from track debris, but also allows for increased visibility. Drivers are required to wear firesuits, safety harnesses, helmets, and head and neck restraints. Most moving parts on the truck are also shielded, and high pressure components have restraining straps, both in case of an explosion.

Accidents 

There have been few accidents which have resulted in non-driver injuries or fatalities.

On January 16, 2009, at a Monster Jam event in Tacoma, Washington 6-year-old Sebastian Hizey was fatally injured when he was struck by flying debris from the truck Natural High. Hizey succumbed to his injuries the next morning.

On January 25, 2009, the monster truck Samson was involved in an accident in Madison, Wisconsin that caused the death of announcer George Eisenhart, Jr. after he accidentally stepped in front of Samson while it was moving.

On October 6, 2013, the monster truck Big Show plowed into a crowd of spectators in Chihuahua City, Mexico, killing 8 people and injuring 79 others in the Chihuahua monster truck accident. This is the deadliest monster truck incident in the history of the sport.

On September 29, 2014, a monster truck plowed into a crowd of spectators in Haaksbergen, Netherlands, killing three people.

Guinness World Records 
The world's biggest monster truck is Bigfoot 5, built in 1986, with tires that measure .

The first monster truck backflip in a scored competition was achieved in 2010 by Cam McQueen in Nitro Circus.

The first monster truck front flip in a scored competition was achieved in 2017 by Lee O'Donnell in VP Racing Fuels’ Mad Scientist at Monster Jam World Finals 18.

In June 2020, with touring suspended due to the COVID-19 pandemic, Monster Jam staged an event for pay-per-view called Monster Jam Breaking World Records in Bradenton, Florida. As part of the event, many new Guinness-recognized world records were set.

See also

 List of monster trucks
 Mini monster truck
 Pickup truck racing
 Truck racing
 Trophy truck

References

American inventions

Sports entertainment